Samuele Pace (Ponte dell'Olio, 20 January 1980) is a retired Italian rugby union player and his usual position was Wing. 

In 2012–13 Pro12 season, he played for Zebre.

In 2009 and 2010 Pace was named in the Italy A squad for IRB Nations Cup and he represented Italy on 3 occasions, from 2001 to 2005.

References

External links 
It's Rugby France Profile
ESPN Profile
Eurosport Profile

Italian rugby union players
1980 births
Living people
Italy international rugby union players
Rugby union wings